The San Francisco Botanical Garden at Strybing Arboretum (formerly Strybing Arboretum) is located in San Francisco's Golden Gate Park. Its 55 acres (22.3 ha) represents nearly 9,000 different kinds of plants from around the world, with particular focus on Magnolia species, high elevation palms, conifers, and cloud forest species from Central America, South America and Southeast Asia.

San Francisco's County Fair Building is located near the main entrance to the Garden.

History

Plans for the garden were originally laid out in the 1880s by park supervisor John McLaren, but funding was insufficient to begin construction until Helene Strybing left a major bequest in 1927. Planting was begun in 1937 with WPA funds supplemented by local donations, and the Arboretum officially opened in May 1940. As a part of Golden Gate Park, it is officially managed by the city of San Francisco, but the San Francisco Botanical Garden Society plays an important role in providing educational programs, managing volunteers, curatorial staff, and more. Formed in 1955, the San Francisco Botanical Garden Society (formerly the Strybing Arboretum Society) operates the Helen Crocker Russell Library of Horticulture, Garden Bookstore, and monthly plant sales, and offers a wide range of community education programs for children and adults. The Society also raises money for new projects and Garden renovations.

In 2004, Strybing Arboretum changed its name to San Francisco Botanical Garden at Strybing Arboretum, and the Arboretum Society followed suit, becoming San Francisco Botanical Garden Society at Strybing Arboretum.

Plant collections

The gardens are organized into several specialized collections:
 Mediterranean
California Native
 John Muir Nature Trail
 Redwood Grove
 Chile
 South Africa
 Australia
 Mediterranean Basin Region 
 Mild-temperate climate 
 New Zealand
 Moon-viewing Garden - a Japanese design
 Temperate Asia Garden
 Montane tropic 
 Mesoamerican Cloud Forest
 Southeast Asian Cloud Forest (in development)
 Andean Cloud Forest (in development)
 Specialty collections
 Ancient Plant Garden 
 Succulent garden 
 Dwarf Conifer garden
 Exhibition Garden
 Garden of Fragrance
 Zellerbach Garden of Perennials
 Dry Mexico
 Rhododendron Garden
 Magnolias & Camellias (found in many collections)

The mild Mediterranean climate is ideal for plants from surprisingly many parts of the world; the arboretum does not include greenhouses for species requiring other climate types.

See also 

 California native plants
 List of botanical gardens in the United States
 North American Plant Collections Consortium
 49-Mile Scenic Drive

References

External links 
 San Francisco Botanical Garden homepage
"Pianos take over SF botanical gardens for 'Flower Piano' event"  KTVU, July 2018 
"SF Botanical Garden digs its volunteers who get hands dirty" SF Gate, June 2018
"The Bay Area’s Largest Plant Sale Returns to Golden Gate Park"  SF Station, April 2018
"How the Wealthy Stole 55 Acres of Golden Gate Park"   Medium, July 19, 2013

Arboreta in California
Botanical gardens in California
Golden Gate Park
Landmarks in San Francisco
Gardens in San Francisco